Faruk Sükan (1921 – 3 January 2005)  was a Turkish physician, politician and government minister.

Biography
Sükan was born in Karaman. In 1946, he graduated from the School of Medicine at Istanbul University. After practicing as a Doctor of Medicine, he got interested in politics, and joined Democrat Party (DP). In 1957, he was elected as the mayor of Ereğli in Konya Province. The government of the Democrat Party was overthrown during the 1960 coup d'état. After the DP was banned, Sükan joined the succeeding Justice Party (AP). He entered the parliament as a deputy of Konya Province after the 1961 general elections. In the 29th government of Turkey, he was appointed the Minister of Health (20 February 1965 – 27 October 1965). In the 30th government of Turkey, he served as the Minister of Interior (27 October 1965 – 1 August 1969). On 18 December 1970, he took part in establishing the Democratic Party along with a number of the Justice Party politicians. In the 42nd government of Turkey, Sükan became the deputy prime minister (5 January 1978 – 20 September 1979). On 18 December 1978, he was elected as the chairman of the Democratic Party. Following the 1980 coup d'état, he left politics.

Sükan died on 3 January 2005 in Ankara. He was buried at Cebeci Asri Cemetery following a memorial ceremony in front of the parliament building and the religious funeral at Kocatepe Mosque. He was married with four children.

References

20th-century Turkish physicians
1921 births
2005 deaths
People from Karaman
Istanbul University Cerrahpaşa Faculty of Medicine alumni
Deputies of Konya
Democrat Party (Turkey, 1946–1961) politicians
Justice Party (Turkey) politicians
Democratic Party (Turkey, 1970) politicians
Members of the 29th government of Turkey
Members of the 30th government of Turkey
Members of the 42nd government of Turkey
Health ministers of Turkey
Ministers of the Interior of Turkey
Deputy Prime Ministers of Turkey
Burials at Cebeci Asri Cemetery
Leaders of political parties in Turkey